Oncopera is a genus of moths of the family Hepialidae. There are 12 described species, all endemic to Australia. The larvae usually feed on grasses, although that of O. intricata has been recorded on strawberry.

Species
Oncopera alboguttata (Ebor grassgrub) - New South Wales
Oncopera alpina (alpine grassgrub) - New South Wales
Food plant: Poa
Oncopera brachyphylla (roundheaded pasture webworm) - Queensland
Food plants include Panicum
Oncopera brunneata
Oncopera epargyra
Oncopera fasciculatus (underground grassgrub) - Western Australia, South Australia, Victoria
Oncopera intricata (corbie) - Tasmania
Larva recorded on Fragaria as well as grasses
Oncopera intricoides
Oncopera mitocera (flatheaded pasture webworm) - Queensland
Food plants include Digitaria, Panicum and Setaria
Oncopera parva
Oncopera rufobrunnea (winter corbie) - New South Wales, Victoria, Tasmania
Oncopera tindalei (Tindale's grassgrub) - New South Wales (named after Norman Barnett Tindale)

External links
Hepialidae genera

Hepialidae
Taxa named by Francis Walker (entomologist)
Exoporia genera